Uttara kaveri (Agaram Aru) is a river flowing in the Vellore district of the Indian state of Tamil Nadu.

See also 
List of rivers of Tamil Nadu

References 

Rivers of Tamil Nadu
Rivers of India

ta:அகரம் ஆறு